The 1989 Grand Prix de Tennis de Lyon was a men's tennis tournament played on indoor carpet courts at the Palais des Sports de Gerland in Lyon, France, and was part of the 1989 Nabisco Grand Prix. It was the third edition of the tournament and was held from 20 February through 27 February 1989. Second-seeded John McEnroe won the singles title.

Finals

Singles

 John McEnroe defeated  Jakob Hlasek 6–3, 7–6
 It was McEnroe's 2nd title of the year and the 138th of his career.

Doubles

 Eric Jelen /  Michael Mortensen defeated  Jakob Hlasek /  John McEnroe 6–2, 3–6, 6–3
 It was Jelen's 1st title of the year and the 3rd of his career. It was Mortensen's only title of the year and the 5th of his career.

References

External links
 ITF tournament edition details

Grand Prix de Tennis de Lyon
Open Sud de France
Grand Prix de Tennis de Lyon